Colegio Hebreo Tarbut is a private Jewish school in Colonia Lomas de Vista Hermosa, Cuajimalpa, Mexico City. The school serves kindergarten through high school. This school applies the IB (International Baccalaureate) system and the Why Tarbut which helps students learn real life skills and advance academically and personally.

History
Classes began on February 1, 1942. Initially it was located at Calles de Amsterdam 115. Its second location was Amsterdam 79. It moved into the larger Lago Merú 55 in 1945.

It had the International Baccalaureate program since 2009.

References

External links
 Colegio Hebreo Tarbut 

Jewish schools in Mexico
Jews and Judaism in Mexico City
Cuajimalpa
High schools in Mexico City
Private schools in Mexico
1942 establishments in Mexico
Educational institutions established in 1942